Mark Bin Bakar is an Indigenous Australian musician, comedian and radio announcer, writer, director/producer as well as an indigenous rights campaigner based in Broome, in the Kimberley region of Western Australia. He is best known for his radio and television character, the acid-tongued Mary Geddarrdyu or Mary G, who has gained a national cult following and has been described as a Dame Edna Everage in thongs. In character Mary G has hosted a radio program and hosted a variety show broadcast nationally on SBS Television.

Career

Mary G
The son of a Catholic Indigenous mother and a Malay Muslim father from Singapore, Bakar created the character Mary G as a Stolen Generations woman like his mother. She first featured on Bin Bakar's radio show in Broome at Radio Goolarri in 1993 where she tackled issues of domestic violence, sexual health and reconciliation, and was particularly popular with aboriginal women.

The Mary G show has played at the Sydney Opera House and at festivals and conferences right around Australia. The Mary G show has also travelled to rural and remote communities across the country, including an extensive tour right across W A.

Bakar continues to present the Mary G radio show for three hours every Wednesday night; it is broadcast to over 100 radio stations via the National Indigenous Radio Service (NIRS).  He also tours across the country with his live cabaret show. He is only able to combine these two activities because he carries a portable radio studio whenever he leaves home base in Broome.

Music
Bakar was the founder of Stompen Ground, a musical event that was held in Broome and televised nationally. Mary G won a Deadly Award in 2005 for Excellence in Film or Theatrical Score.

Bakar is a talented musician in his own right and was in WA Indigenous bands such as 'Section 54' and 'Footprince'.  Twenty years ago, Bakar established Ab Music in Perth; Ab Music is a place for teaching Aboriginal people to be musicians.

Activism 
Bakar has also been actively involved in seeking justice for members of the Stolen Generations; part of this involvement has been through chairing the Kimberley Stolen Generations Corporation.  He has also produced two albums of songs about the Stolen Generations. Bakar was also an inaugural deputy convenor of the 'Stolen Generations Alliance' formed in 2006.

On 11 July 2007, he did a three-hour show with The Pigram Brothers, also from Broome, and other musicians in the Berrimah Jail, Darwin.  This was broadcast live over the NIRS Network; this concert broadcast is without precedent, being the first national broadcast of a 'jail concert'. In 2009 he appeared at the one movement concert for aboriginal reconciliation.

Bakar gave a number of keynote addresses in 2006 and 2007, including a speech given in the Great Hall of Parliament house in Canberra on Sorry Day 2007.

Awards
In 2007, Bakar was honoured to be named the NAIDOC Person of the year in recognition of his work.

Also in 2007, it was announced that Bakar was "West Australian of the Year", which made him a finalist for Australian of the Year in 2008.

References

Something Mary, Broome Happenings, 13 January 2006, p. 3

External links
The Black Queen of the Kimberley, Mary G
Deadlys nomination 2005
Mary G's Home Page
Snap, Cackle and Pop, Sydney Morning Herald, 27 May 2005

Australian radio presenters
Indigenous Australians from Western Australia
Living people
Australian indigenous rights activists
Australian people of Malay descent
Australian people of Singaporean descent
Australian Muslims
Australian male comedians
Australian satirists
Muslim male comedians
Year of birth missing (living people)